New Fuzhou may refer to:

 Little Fuzhou, a neighborhood in New York City
 Sibu, a town in Malaysia

See also 
 Fuzhou (disambiguation)